Caloptilia immuricata is a moth of the family Gracillariidae. It is known from Ecuador and Peru.

References

immuricata
Moths of South America
Moths described in 1915